Mary Jo Catlett (born September 2, 1938) is an American actress. She is a main cast member on the animated series SpongeBob SquarePants, providing the voice of Mrs. Puff. She is also known for originating the role of Ernestina in the 1964 Broadway production of Hello, Dolly! and for playing Pearl Gallagher, the third housekeeper on Diff'rent Strokes.

Catlett was born in Denver, Colorado, where she performed in a variety of plays and eventually directed a company of Pirates of Penzance. Throughout the 1960s and 1970s, she performed in Off-Broadway and Broadway musicals, often taking light-hearted, humorous roles. Since the late 1960s, Catlett has appeared in television shows such as M*A*S*H, The Dukes of Hazzard, and General Hospital. Catlett received Los Angeles Drama Critics Circle Awards in 1978 and 1980, a nomination for Best Featured Actress in a Musical at the Ovation Awards in 1995, and a Daytime Emmy Award nomination in 1990.

In 1998, Catlett joined the main cast of the then-upcoming cartoon SpongeBob SquarePants as the voice of Mrs. Puff, the title character's teacher, who has become her longest-running and most well-known role. Series creator Stephen Hillenburg had seen Catlett perform on stage and sought her out for the part himself. She quickly accepted and has since voiced Mrs. Puff in every season of the cartoon, in addition to all of the theatrical SpongeBob films and video games. In 2001, she received an Annie Award nomination for her voice-over work as Mrs. Puff.

Early life
Catlett was born in Denver, Colorado, on September 2, 1938, the daughter of Cornelia M. (née Callaghan) and Robert J. Catlett. She has a sister, Patricia Marie, who is a nun with the Dominican Order. Catlett is a Catholic.

Career
In 1974, Catlett originated the role of Mrs. Tiffany in Fashion: or, Life in New York. Her performance was well-received; The New York Times theater critic Clive Barnes called Catlett and co-star Henrietta Valor "exceptional ... both particular delights," and Jerry Tallmer of the New York Post said that the play's casting was "top-notch, with particular praise from this quarter for Mary Jo Catlett." Catlett would reprise her role in the 1994 revival of Fashion.

Catlett described herself as a character actress. In a 1988 interview with the Orlando Sentinel, she said, "It has been a plus to be a character actress. There are plenty of them out there but far fewer than ingenues and leading ladies, who perhaps eventually become character actresses. But I always was a character actress. I always was round and funny."

In 1976 and 1980, Catlett received Los Angeles Drama Critics Circle Awards for her roles in Come Back, Little Sheba and Philadelphia, Here I Come!, respectively. In 1995, Catlett's role as Madame de la Grande Bouche in Beauty and the Beast earned her a nomination for Best Featured Actress in a Musical at the Ovation Awards. Catlett became a main cast member on Diff'rent Strokes in its fifth season, playing the third housekeeper, Pearl Gallagher. She also played characters on General Hospital (for which she was nominated for a Daytime Emmy Award) and in several episodes of the television sitcom M*A*S*H.

In 1987, Catlett directed a production of Dan Goggin's Nunsense after meeting with Goggin and discussing the character of Sister Mary Regina. It was staged at the Mark Two Dinner Theatre in Orlando, Florida. Catlett decided to play Sister Mary as well, taking on a dual role as both director and performer. She was partially inspired to direct the show after witnessing directors' unfair treatment of her castmates in previous productions. She said, "I have worked with many directors who were tyrannical. You get afraid to do anything because he'll yell, 'Don't do that!' It makes you crazy... as a director, I believe that there can be a democracy."

SpongeBob SquarePants
In 1998, Catlett was cast as the voice of Mrs. Puff, one of the main characters of Nickelodeon's then-upcoming animated series SpongeBob SquarePants. She is one of the show's nine main cast members and has performed in every season, as well as in all of the theatrical SpongeBob films and video games. Mrs. Puff has become her longest-running and most well-known role. Stephen Hillenburg, the creator of the cartoon, specifically sought out Catlett to voice Mrs. Puff. He had seen her perform on stage and had a strong vision for Mrs. Puff as a character. Catlett quickly accepted and attended early practice sessions with the rest of the voice cast. Her first official recording as Mrs. Puff took place on August 24, 1998; she recorded dialogue with Tom Kenny as SpongeBob SquarePants and Bill Fagerbakke as Patrick Star in a single booth at Nickelodeon Animation Studio for the episode "Boating School".

In 2001, Catlett was nominated for an Annie Award for her voice-over work as Mrs. Puff, placing in the category "Best Voice Acting by a Female Performer in an Animated Production." Kenny was also nominated at the same ceremony, making Catlett and Kenny the first two SpongeBob cast members to be nominated for an award.

As of 2017, voicing Mrs. Puff is Catlett's only regular television role; Catlett described herself as "basically retired" in 2013, since she is good friends with the other SpongeBob cast members, making the SpongeBob recording booth an easy environment that requires less preparation than in-person performances. The About Group's Nancy Basille noted in 2016 that Catlett's "rich, low tones as teacher Mrs. Puff recall other roles she has had," citing Diff'rent Strokes and M*A*S*H as programs on which she had used a similar voice.

Filmography

Film

Television

Video games

Theatre

References

External links

 
 
 
 Mary Jo Catlett on AboutTheArtists.com

1938 births
Living people
20th-century American actresses
21st-century American actresses
Actresses from New York City
Actresses from Denver
American film actresses
American musical theatre actresses
American stage actresses
American soap opera actresses
American television actresses
American voice actresses
American Roman Catholics